Sky Harbor Airport may refer to:

Canada
 Goderich Airport (Sky Harbour) (ICAO: CYGD), in Goderich, Ontario

United States
Skyharbor Airport (FAA LID: S63), in Dallas County, Alabama
Phoenix Sky Harbor International Airport (IATA/FAA LID: PHX), in Phoenix, Arizona
Sky Harbor Airport & Seaplane Base (FAA LID: DYT), in Duluth, Minnesota
Sky Harbor Airport (Washington) (FAA LID: S86), in Sultan, Washington